William Ewin was an American politician.

William Ewin may also refer to:

William Howell Ewin, usurer

See also
William Ewing (disambiguation)